Winfried Toll (born 1955) is a German conductor, singer, composer and academic teacher.

Career 
Born in Dorsten, Toll first studied theologie and philosophy at University of Münster and the University of Freiburg. He then studied composition, music theory and music pedagogy with Klaus Huber and Brian Ferneyhough at the Musikhochschule Freiburg. He took master classes in singing with Elisabeth Schwarzkopf, and in conducting with Helmuth Rilling.
 
From 1988, Toll has been conductor of the Camerata Vocale Freiburg, from 1994 to 2002 director of the choir , and from 1997 he has been the artistic director of the Frankfurter Kantorei. The same year he was appointed professor of the Hochschule für Musik und Darstellende Kunst Frankfurt am Main.

External links 
 
 Winfried Toll Frankfurter Kantorei 
 Winfried Toll: Aus der tschechischen Musik strömt Kraft aus Radia Praha 2005 

German male conductors (music)
1955 births
Living people
People from Dorsten
University of Münster alumni
University of Freiburg alumni
Hochschule für Musik Freiburg alumni
Academic staff of the Frankfurt University of Music and Performing Arts
21st-century German conductors (music)
21st-century German male musicians